Mohawk is a town in Montgomery County, New York, United States. The population was 3,844 at the 2010 census.

The Town of Mohawk is on the northern border of the county, west of the City of Amsterdam. The county seat, Fonda, is located in Mohawk.

History
Jesuit missionaries entered this region from Quebec around 1642 to work among the Mohawk. The principal village of the Mohawk was Caughnawaga, which was later developed as the site of Fonda.

The Town was settled around 1725 by colonists from the English/Dutch region to the east around Albany. The Mohawk District, which became the original Town of Mohawk, was created in March 1772 by Sir William Johnson when Tryon County was split off from Albany County. It was the easternmost of five districts in the new county, which eastern boundary ran north from the Delaware River at the Pennsylvania line through present Schoharie County to a north–south line that now forms the eastern boundaries of Montgomery, Fulton, and Hamilton Counties, all the way to Canada. The district's western limit was an arbitrary north–south line drawn through "the noses", prominent rock prominences through which the Mohawk River flows four miles east of Canajoharie (on the south side).

During the American Revolution, the town was invaded in 1780 by an army of British-Allied Iroquois and British Loyalists. The original District or "Town of Mohawk" was eliminated in 1793 by its division into the Towns of Florida and Charleston. The present town was created from part of the Town of Johnstown in 1837, the population of which was 3,112.

In 1865, the population of Mohawk was 2,948.

In 1993, Montgomery Manor, a colonial estate of Major Jelles Fonda, was purchased by the not-for-profit community, Kanatsiohareke (“Gah nah joe hah lay geh”). This Haudenosaunee community is led by elder and spiritual leader Tom Sakokwenionkwas Porter. This community looks to promote the development of the traditions, philosophy, and governance of the Haudenosaunee, and to contribute to the preservation of the culture of the Haudenosaunee.

Geography

The northern town line is the border of Fulton County, New York, and the southern town boundary is defined by the Mohawk River.

New York State Route 5 parallels the Mohawk River. New York State Route 30A and New York State Route 334 intersect NY-5 at Fonda.

Demographics

As of the census of 2010, there were 3,844 people, 1,528 households, and 1,043 families residing in the town. The population density was 112.4 people per square mile (43.4/km2). There were 1,607 housing units at an average density of 46.3 per square mile (17.9/km2). The racial makeup of the town was 97.7% White, 0.4% African-American, 0.2% Native American, 0.5% Asian, 0.2% from other races, and 1% from two or more races. Hispanic or Latino of any race were 2.2% of the population.

There were 1,528 households, out of which 26.6% had children under the age of 18 living with them, 68.3% were married couples living together, 10.8% had a female householder with no husband present, and 31.7% were non-families. 30.2% of all households were made up of individuals, and 28% had someone living alone who was 65 years of age or older. The average household size was 2.49 and the average family size was 2.98.

In the town, the population was spread out, with 25.4% under the age of 18, 6.8% from 18 to 24, 28.2% from 25 to 44, 24.8% from 45 to 64, and 14.2% who were 65 years of age or older. The median age was 38 years. For every 100 females, there were 94.2 males. For every 100 females age 18 and over, there were 93.4 males.

The median income for a household in the town was $25,714, and the median income for a family was $62,174. Males had a median income of $37,465 versus $36,891 for females. The per capita income for the town was $27,725. About 2.8% of families and 7.4% of the population were below the poverty line, including 3.4% of those under age 18 and 6.2% of those age 65 or over.

Communities in the Town of Mohawk
Berryville – A hamlet northwest of Fonda.
Big Nose – A location in the southwestern part of Mohawk. With "Little Nose" on the opposite bank of the Mohawk River, it marks a place called "The Noses."
East Stone Arabia – A hamlet in the western part of the town.
Fonda – The Village of Fonda is the county seat, and is located on the north bank of the Mohawk River on NY Route 5. It is near the Caughnawaga Indian Village Site.
Tribes Hill – A hamlet in the eastern part of the town on NY-5.
Yosts – A hamlet on NY-5 and the north bank of the Mohawk River, west of Fonda.

References

External links
 Early history of Mohawk

Towns in Montgomery County, New York
Populated places on the Mohawk River